Junior Williams (born 3 November 1987) is a Grenadian football player who played as a left midfielder for the Grenada national football team.

He was an injury replacement for Kithson Bain in the 2011 CONCACAF Gold Cup, and played in two matches.

Personal life
Williams is the cousin of Shalrie Joseph.

References

External links
 
 

1987 births
Living people
Grenadian footballers
Grenada international footballers
Grenada under-20 international footballers
Association football midfielders
Queens Park Rangers SC players
2011 CONCACAF Gold Cup players
People from St. George's, Grenada